Jules Cottin (1868–1922) was a mandolin virtuoso who played in Paris from the 1890s. A pupil of the guitarist Jacques Bosch, he became part of the mandolin revival, which revitalized the instrument after its long decline in the 19th century. He was part of a group of virtuosi mandolinists, including Giuseppe Silvestri, Ferdinando de Cristofaro, and Jean Pietrapertosa, who played before enthusiastic Paris audiences. He was also a composer and author, writing the 1891 mandolin method book, Celèbre Méthode Complète Theoretique et Pratique de Mandoline.

Cottin played in Paris with his brother Alfred (1863–1923), who played guitar, and his sister Madeleine (1876 – d. after 1952). His siblings were also composers and, like Jules, his sister wrote a mandolin method book.

Selected works

Compositions
Au fil de l'eau. Barcarolle for mandolin & guitar.
Succès-Mandoline. Morceaux pour mandoline seule (Paris: J. Hamelle, 1900)
Contemplation. Romance sans paroles (Paris: E. Weilter, 1902)
Études mélodiques d'agilité pour mandoline (Paris, 1907; also: Paris: M. Jumade, 1914)

Method
Méthode élémentaire de mandoline (Paris: A. Leduc, 1903). English edition: Complete Theoretical and Practical Method for the Mandoline (Paris: A. Leduc, 1896-1906)

References

External links
Chansons napolitaines (public domain sheet music) at Bibliothèque Nationale de France

See also
 List of mandolinists (sorted)

1868 births
1922 deaths
19th-century classical composers
20th-century classical composers
French classical composers
French male classical composers
French classical mandolinists
French music educators
19th-century French composers
20th-century French composers
20th-century French male musicians
19th-century French male musicians